Wolf Crater may refer to:

 Wolf (crater), on the moon
 Wolfe Creek Crater, Western Australia